"What We Live For" is a song recorded by American indie rock band American Authors as the third single from their second studio album, What We Live For. The song was released on April 1, 2016.

Promotion
American Authors unveiled "What We Live For" on April 1, 2016. The music video directed by Rosco Guerrero was premiered through Vevo on June 22, 2016. Jay Pryor remix version was released on September 16, 2016.

Track listing

Charts

References

2016 singles
2016 songs
American Authors songs
Island Records singles
Songs written by Aaron Accetta
Song recordings produced by Aaron Accetta
Songs written by Shep Goodman
Songs written by Ryan McMahon (record producer)
Songs written by Ben Berger
Song recordings produced by Captain Cuts